Framing Hanley is an American rock band formed in Nashville, Tennessee in 2005. They released their first studio album in August 2007, titled The Moment.

History

Formation and The Moment (2005–2009) 
Lead singer & songwriter Kenneth Nixon, guitarists Tim Huskinson and Brandon Wooten, bassist Luke McDuffee and drummer Chris Vest came together to form Framing Hanley and quickly gained a large following in Nashville. First formed in 2005 (Under the name Embers Fade), the band posted some demos of their songs on the bands Myspace page. In November 2006, these demos were discovered by Brett Hestla, former Creed bassist and frontman of Dark New Day. Hestla helped the young Nashville based quintet record a 2-song demo in his Florida studio which he showed to Jeff Hanson (Creed, Sevendust, Paramore) and his record label Silent Majority Group. In an interview with HitQuarters Hanson said he "flipped out" when he heard the song "Hear Me Now" and decided immediately he wanted to sign them. The following day he went to see the band play in Nashville and claims that in his rush to secure the band's signatures he wrote up their deal on a napkin. Hanson became not only their label boss but also their manager, says the band.

In June 2008, Tim left the band due to recurring back problems and to pursue other endeavors in his life. He was replaced by a friend of the band, guitarist Ryan Belcher. This was originally a temporary arrangement but Ryan soon became a permanent member of the band.

A Promise to Burn (2009–2011) 
In early November 2009, Framing Hanley entered the studio to start working on the sophomore record, A Promise to Burn. In an interview with alternativeaddiction.com, lead singer Kenneth Nixon stated that "The album tells a story that a lot of us have been through, where you have to have everything taken away from you before you can be humbled and know how lucky you are, it's sad that it's like that, but it's true in a lot of people's cases." Nixon says the band has a lot to prove with the new album, foremost that the band is more than just 'that rock band that covered Lil Wayne's song "Lollipop". "Three years later when one song that they are remembering you for is a cover song, it kinda leaves a bad taste in your mouth", said Nixon. "That song did a lot of things for our band, but it was really just something that we were doing for fun." Nixon says the band was discouraged when the band re-released their debut single "Hear Me Now" following the success of "Lollipop" and saw very little response. "It leaves us with something to prove on this record. We are not just a band that covers songs, we want to prove we are a band that writes rock songs that we care about, and that is what we did with this record", says the band.

In December 2009, the band won the Best Modern Rock Band at the Top In Rock Awards. Their first single "You Stupid Girl" is available on iTunes and all digital retailers now. According to their Twitter page, "Back to Go Again" is the 1st single to be released in the United Kingdom instead of "You Stupid Girl". A Promise to Burn was released in stores, on iTunes, and all music retailers on May 25. The iTunes deluxe version contains two bonus tracks, "Can Always Quit Tomorrow" and "Pretty Faces". The band also contributed a cover of the Nirvana song "In Bloom" for Kerrang!'s cover album of Nevermind, released in their special edition issue celebrating the 20th anniversary of the grunge act's breakthrough release.

The Sum of Who We Are (2011–2015) 
Through Facebook and Twitter, the band has uploaded a video explaining everything that has happened to them in the past year. Nixon explains the band leaving their record label and the struggle to make another album. They created a Kickstarter campaign to help fund their record, believing that their fans could cover the cost of making the new album by only asking a dollar per fan.

Framing Hanley enter the studio to record their successfully funded album. According to their official Twitter feed, and other fan sites, Framing Hanley has named Robert Venable as the mixing engineer for this album. In August 2012, Framing Hanley revealed the title of their third album would be The Sum of Who We Are. In August 2013, Framing Hanley announced the departure of Luke McDuffee as bassist. The original release date of the album was October 22, however due to legal issues it had been postponed. They had announced a new record deal and that the album's new release date would be April 29, 2014. There will be a single "Criminal". The day before the release of the album Billboard streamed the album. In late May 2014 they released a music video for "Criminal".

Hiatus (2015–2018) 

The band announced that they were going on a hiatus via Facebook in 2015. Lead singer Kenneth Nixon announced a reunion in 2018.

Reunion and Envy (2018–present) 
Exactly after three years of the hiatus, the band announced their reunion via Facebook on April 11, 2018, and announced their comeback. Their album entitled Envy was released on February 21, 2020.

Members 

Current members
 Kenneth Nixon – lead vocals, piano, rhythm guitar (2005–present)
 Jonathan Stoye – lead guitar, bass, backing vocals  (2013–present) 
 Nic Brooks – guitars  (2018–present)

Touring members
 Matt Naff – drums (2022–present)

Former members
 Tim Huskinson – lead guitar  (2005–2007) 
 Luke McDuffee – bass, backing vocals (2005–2013)
 Brandon Wootten – guitars, backing vocals (2005–2015)
 Chris Vest – drums (2005–2015)
 Shad Teems – drums, piano, backing vocals  (2018–2021) 
 Ryan Belcher – lead guitar, piano, backing vocals (2007–2019)

Timeline

Discography

Albums

Studio albums

Singles

Music videos

References

External links 
 Official Twitter feed
 Official Facebook page
 FramingHanley.net
 Hot Indie Artist interview

Musical groups from Nashville, Tennessee
Musical groups established in 2005
American post-grunge musical groups
Alternative rock groups from Tennessee
Musical groups disestablished in 2015
Musical groups reestablished in 2018